

2003 Schedules
n.b. Winning Driver are mentioned on the right

2003 D1 Grand Prix Point Series
Round 1 - February 2 - Tsukuba Circuit, Ibaraki Prefecture, Japan - Nobushige Kumakubo (S15)
Round 2 - March 8/9 - Bihoku Highland Circuit, Okayama Prefecture, Japan - Kazuhiro Tanaka (S15)
Round 3 - April 19/20 - Sports Land SUGO, Miyagi Prefecture, Japan - Nobushige Kumakubo (S15)
Round 4 - July 6 - Fuji Speedway, Shizuoka Prefecture, Japan - Youichi Imamura (FD3S)
Round 5 - August 9/10 - Ebisu South Course, Fukushima Prefecture, Japan - Youichi Imamura (FD3S)
Round 6 - October 4/5 - Sekia Hills, Kumamoto Prefecture, Japan - Katsuhiro Ueo (AE85)
Round 7 - November 26/27 - Tsukuba Circuit, Ibaraki Prefecture, Japan - Nobuteru Taniguchi (S15)

2003 D1 Grand Prix Exhibition Matches
D1 US Exhibition - August 31 - Irwindale Speedway, Irwindale, California, United States - Katsuhiro Ueo (AE86)

Final Championship Results

Source: D1GP Official Site 2003 Championship table

See also
 D1 Grand Prix
 Drifting (motorsport)

Sources
D1GP Results Database 2000-2004

D1 Grand Prix seasons
D1 Grand Prix
2003 in Japanese motorsport